The 1940 Oklahoma A&M Cowboys football team represented Oklahoma A&M College in the 1940 college football season. This was the 40th year of football at A&M and the second under Jim Lookabaugh. The Cowboys played their home games at Lewis Field in Stillwater, Oklahoma. They finished the season 6–3–1, 4–1 in the Missouri Valley Conference.

Schedule

References

Oklahoma AandM
Oklahoma State Cowboys football seasons
Oklahoma AandM